Robert Carr (1916–2012) was a British Conservative politician.

Robert Carr may also refer to:

Politicians
 Robert Carr (MP for Boston) (c. 1511–1590), MP for Boston 1559
 Robert Kerr (MP) or Carr (1578–1654), English politician
 Robert Carr, 1st Earl of Somerset (c. 1587–1645), Scottish politician
 Sir Robert Carr, 3rd Baronet, British politician, Privy Counsellor of England, MP for Lincolnshire 1665–1685
 Robert S. Carr (1845–1925), American politician, president of the West Virginia Senate from 1889 to 1891

Others
 Robert Carr, 1st Earl of Ancram (c. 1578–1654), Scottish nobleman and writer
 Sir Robert Carr, Kt., English officer who secured the surrender of Fort Cassimir, New Netherland in 1664
 Robert Carr (bishop) (1774–1841), English churchman, bishop of Chichester, 1824, and bishop of Worcester, 1831
 Robert Carr (baritone) (1881–1948), English baritone singer and recording artist
 Robert Frederick Carr (1943–2007), American serial killer
 Robert K. Carr (1908–1979), American scholar in the field of government and political science
 Robert Spencer Carr (1909–1994), American writer
 Milton Robert Carr (born 1943), commonly known as Bob Carr, American politician, U.S. Representative from Michigan
 Robert Carr (programmer) (born 1956), American computer programmer
 Robert Carr (activist) (1963–2011), Trinidadian scholar and human rights activist

See also
 Bob Carr (disambiguation)
 Robert Kerr (disambiguation)